Paris Airport may refer to:

 Paris Aéroport (formerly Aéroports de Paris or ADP), brand that serves  international airports in Paris

Airports serving Paris, France:
 Charles de Gaulle Airport – Paris's main international airport
 Orly Airport – Paris's second international airport
 Beauvais-Tillé Airport – the airport of Beauvais, serving as Paris airport for budget airlines
 Paris–Le Bourget Airport – the original city airport, now used for general aviation and the Air Show
 Châlons Vatry Airport – cargo airport at Châlons-en-Champagne, another airport serving as Paris airport for budget airlines

Airports in other places named Paris:
 Paris Municipal Airport in Paris, Arkansas, United States
 Bear Lake County Airport in Paris, Idaho, United States
 Edgar County Airport in Paris, Illinois, United States
 Henry County Airport (Tennessee) in Paris, Tennessee, United States
 Cox Field in Paris, Texas, United States